is a 2011 erotica "found footage" film directed by Kōji Shiraishi.

Plot

A criminal gossip magazine receives a video tape from Japan's most notorious criminal rapist, the "Hyper Villain" Shouhei Eno. On the tape, Eno reveals himself and proclaims he has raped 107 girls in 10 years. He also offers the magazine a chance to interview him and film his upcoming 108th rape.

See also

The Curse (2005), another "found footage" mockumentary by the same director.
Occult (2009), another "found footage" mockumentary by the same director.
Shirome (2010), another "found footage" mockumentary from the same director.
Bachiatari bouryuku ningen (2011), another "found footage" mockumentary from the same director.

References

External links

2011 horror films
2011 films
Found footage films
Japanese horror films
2010s Japanese-language films
2010s mockumentary films
Films directed by Kōji Shiraishi
Japanese psychological horror films
Japanese supernatural horror films
Japanese erotic films
Films about rape
2010s Japanese films